The 1807 New York gubernatorial election was held in April 1807 to elect the Governor and Lieutenant Governor of New York. Despite losing New York City 1,673 votes to 1,807, Daniel D. Tompkins defeated incumbent Morgan Lewis.

Candidates
The Clintonian faction of the Democratic-Republican Party nominated associate justice of the New York Supreme Court of Judicature Daniel D. Tompkins. They nominated incumbent John Broome for Lieutenant Governor.

The Lewisite faction of the Democratic-Republican Party nominated incumbent Morgan Lewis. They nominated former Speaker of the New York State Assembly Thomas Storm for Lieutenant Governor.

Results
The Clintonian ticket of Tompkins and Broome was elected.

References

Sources
Result: The Tribune Almanac 1841

See also
New York gubernatorial elections
New York state elections

1807
Gubernatorial election
April 1807 events
New York